Espelid is a surname. Notable people with the surname include:

Halldor Espelid (1920–1944), Norwegian pilot
Ingrid Espelid Hovig (1924–2018), Norwegian television chef and author of cook books
Mons Espelid (1926–2009), Norwegian politician and dentist

Norwegian-language surnames